The Henderson Tennis Open is a tournament for professional female tennis players played on outdoor hard courts. The event is classified as a $60,000 ITF Women's Circuit tournament and also part of the USTA Pro Circuit calendar. It has been held in Las Vegas, United States, since 2009 and played at the Red Rock Country Club. It was previously played at the Darling Tennis Center, the former site of the ATP Tennis Channel Open.

The tournament was founded by Tyler Weekes of Courtthink, LLC, who also serves as the co-tournament director along with Jordan Butler, a Las Vegas attorney and a WTA-certified player agent under his agency Agent Atleta.

In the summer of 2012, Weekes met Redfoo (a.k.a. Stefan Gordy) of the hit techno group LMFAO and gave him a tennis lesson at the Cosmopolitan of Las Vegas. Weekes expressed concern that his tournament was in need of a new title sponsor and soon after Redfoo agreed to have his Party Rock line of clothing become the new title sponsor of the event.

The Party Rock Open was held at Darling Tennis Center and featured a Cox Kids Day on the opening day of the tournament that was attended by more than 500 local Las Vegas children, as well as Redfoo. The highlight of the tournament came on semifinal Saturday night when Redfoo participated in a flash mob and was joined by hundreds of kids on court before the evening session. He sang two of his hit songs, including Party Rock Anthem and Sexy and I Know It.

The Party Rock Open is played the last week of September and was won in 2012 by 19-year-old American Lauren Davis, who beat fellow teenager Shelby Rogers in the final.

In 2014, the tournament ended its two-year association with Redfoo and Party Rock Open, which also featured the Party Rock crew and a full-time Deejay on Center Court. As a result, the tournament name changed to the Red Rock Pro Open and the site of the tournament moved back to the Red Rock Country Club, where it was originally held between 2009 and 2011 as the Lexus of Las Vegas Open.

In 2019, the venue of the tournament was moved to the Dragonridge Country Club Tennis and Athletic Center in Henderson and subsequently the name of the tournament was changed to the Henderson Tennis Open.

In 2021, the tournament was moved to the Whitney Mesa Tennis Complex.

Past finals

Singles

Doubles

References

External links
 ITF search 
 

 
ITF Women's World Tennis Tour
Party Rock Open
Hard court tennis tournaments in the United States
Tennis in Las Vegas
Recurring sporting events established in 2009
Tennis tournaments in Nevada